The 1923 Brown Bears football team represented Brown University during the 1923 college football season. Led by 22nd-year head coach Edward N. Robinson, the Bears compiled a record of 6–4.

Schedule

References

Brown
Brown Bears football seasons
Brown Bears football